Albert Alexander Wray (September 6, 1858 – February 23, 1924) was an American lawyer and politician from New York.

Life
Albert A. Wray was born in Cape Girardeau, Missouri on September 6, 1858. He attended the public schools, and taught school in Missouri. He removed to New York City in 1880, studied law, was admitted to the bar in 1885, and practiced law in New York City, but resided in Brooklyn from 1888 on.

Wray was a member of the New York State Assembly (Kings Co., 15th D.) in 1894 and 1895.

He was a member of the New York State Senate (8th D.) from 1896 to 1898, sitting in the 119th, 120th and 121st New York State Legislatures.

In 1905, he and his wife Jessie Anne were divorced, and the four children remained with their mother. In 1909, she sued him to receive unpaid alimony amounting to $30,000. At this time, Wray lived with his second wife in West Orange, New Jersey.

Albert A. Wray died at his home in West Orange on February 23, 1924.

References

 The New York Red Book compiled by Edgar L. Murlin (published by James B. Lyon, Albany NY, 1897; pg. 176f, 404 and 511)
 Sketches of the members of the Legislature in The Evening Journal Almanac (1895; pg. 56)
 ASKS $30,000 BACK ALIMONY in NYT on September 5, 1909
 Wray people search

1858 births
1924 deaths
Republican Party New York (state) state senators
People from Brooklyn
Republican Party members of the New York State Assembly
People from Cape Girardeau, Missouri